A Million Little Things is an American family drama television series created by DJ Nash for ABC. Produced by ABC Signature and Kapital Entertainment, it features an ensemble cast including David Giuntoli, Grace Park, Romany Malco, Christina Moses, Allison Miller, James Roday Rodriguez, Stéphanie Szostak, Tristan Byon, and Lizzy Greene. The show received a put pilot commitment at ABC in August 2017; A Million Little Things was ordered to series in May 2018 and premiered on September 26, 2018. In May 2021, the series was renewed for a fourth season which premiered on September 22, 2021. In May 2022, the series was renewed for a fifth season. In November 2022, it was announced that the fifth season would be the last for the series, with the season premiering on February 8, 2023.

Premise
In Boston, a tight-knit circle of friends is shocked after a member of the group unexpectedly dies by suicide. The friends realize that they need to finally start living life as they cope with their loss. The title is a reference to the saying "Friendship isn't a big thing – it's a million little things".

Cast and characters

Main
 David Giuntoli as Eddie Saville, a musician, music teacher and stay-at-home dad who is a recovering alcoholic having marital problems with Katherine. He is the father of Theo and Charlie.
 Romany Malco as Rome Howard, an aspiring filmmaker who yearns to accomplish something more meaningful with his life
 Allison Miller as Maggie Bloom, a therapist and Gary's ex-girlfriend who survived breast cancer
 Christina Moses as Regina Howard, a chef who wants to open her own restaurant
 Christina Ochoa as Ashley Morales (season 1), Jon's assistant
 Grace Park as Katherine Kim, who used to be the fun one of the group, but now juggles her career as a lawyer with parenting her son, Theo, while trying to repair her marriage
 James Roday Rodriguez as Gary Mendez, a friend of Eddie, Jon, and Rome, and Maggie's ex-boyfriend who also survived breast cancer. His birth name is revealed in season 3 to be Javier Mendez Jr.
 Stéphanie Szostak as Delilah Dixon (seasons 1–3; recurring season 4), Jon's widow and mother of Sophie, Danny and Charlie.
 Tristan Byon as Theo Saville, Eddie and Katherine's son, and Charlie's older half-brother
 Lizzy Greene as Sophie Dixon, Jon and Delilah's oldest child, Danny's older sister and Charlie's older half-sister
 Chance Hurstfield as Danny Dixon (season 2–present; recurring season 1), Jon and Delilah's son, Sophie's younger brother, and Charlie's older half-brother
 Floriana Lima as Darcy Cooper (season 3; recurring season 2, 4), Gary's new love interest, a single mother to Theo's classmate Liam, and a veteran of military service in Afghanistan experiencing PTSD

Recurring

 Ron Livingston as Jon Dixon (season 1; guest season 2–3), a successful businessman who unexpectedly takes his own life
 Constance Zimmer as Jeri Huntington (season 1), a councilwoman 
 Bodhi Sabongui as Elliot (season 1; guest season 2), Danny's crush and later boyfriend
 Henderson Wade as Hunter (season 1), Katherine's co-worker
 Sam Pancake as Carter French, Katherine's legal assistant
 Drea de Matteo as Barbara Nelson (seasons 1–2), a mysterious woman from Jon's past
 Chandler Riggs as PJ Nelson (season 2; guest season 1), a young man who befriends Rome, later revealed to be Barbara Morgan's son
 Melora Hardin as Patricia Bloom (season 4, season 2; guest season 1), Maggie's mother
 Rhys Coiro as Mitch Nelson (season 2; guest season 1), Barbara's husband
 Jason Ritter as Eric (season 2), a man who claimed to have Maggie's deceased brother's heart. He reveals that the heart actually went to his fiancée, who was killed in a car crash that Eric caused.
 Lou Beatty Jr. as Walter Howard (season 2–present; guest season 1), Rome's father
 Ebboney Wilson as Eve (season 2), a young pregnant woman who was planning on giving up her baby for Rome and Regina to adopt but decided to keep the baby
 Anna Akana as Dakota (season 2; guest season 3), a young musician with whom Eddie produced music
 Chris Geere as Jamie (season 3), Maggie's Oxford roommate and friend with benefits
 Mattia Castrillo as Liam (seasons 3–4), a classmate of Theo's who is Darcy's son with her ex-husband
 Adam Swain as Tyrell (season 3; guest season 4), an industrious teenager taken in by Rome and Regina after his mother is deported to Haiti
 Andrew Leeds as Peter Benoit (seasons 3–4), a music instructor who mentors Sophie when she attempts to get accepted into the exclusive music college MMI, and subsequently sexually abuses her.
 Karen Robinson as Florence (season 3; guest season 5)
 Terry Chen as Alan (season 3), a lawyer with whom Katherine forms a friendship and possible romantic relationship as her marriage to Eddie falls apart
 Nikiva Dionne as Shanice Williamson (seasons 3–4), a well-known actress and closeted lesbian who agreed to star in Rome's film before the COVID pandemic shut it down; she later becomes a potential love interest for Katherine
 Ryan Hansen as Camden Lamoureux (season 4), a Boston Bruins player who Maggie is dating
 Andrea Navedo as Valerie Sandoval (season 4), Regina's employee
 Stephnie Weir as Jane Goodman (season 4), a radio station manager who hires Maggie to give therapy advice on the station
 Cameron Esposito as Greta Strobe (season 4–present), Katherine's former high school best friend and current girlfriend

Guest
 Sam Huntington as Tom (seasons 1 and 4), a man Maggie dated when she lived in Chicago, described as a "mystery man" from her past in early press
 Gerald McRaney (season 1) and Paul Guilfoyle (season 2) as Lenny Farache, Delilah's father and Sophie, Danny, and Charlie's grandfather who has Alzheimer's disease
 L. Scott Caldwell as Renee Howard (seasons 1–2), Rome's mother
 Romy Rosemont as Shelly (seasons 1–3), Regina's mother
 James Tupper as Andrew Pollock (seasons 1–2), Regina and Delilah's financial partner in the restaurant
 Tyler Cody as Jake Anderson (seasons 2–3), Sophie's boyfriend who works at Regina and Delilah's restaurant
 Marcia Gay Harden as Alice (season 2), Gary's estranged mother
 Sutton Foster as Chloe (season 2), Eric's deceased fiancée
 Olivia Steele Falconer as Alex Stewart (season 2), Eddie's deceased high school girlfriend
 Gerard Plunkett as Joseph Stewart (seasons 2–3), Alex and Colleen's father
 Betsy Brandt as Colleen (season 2), the sister of Eddie's deceased high school girlfriend
 Andrea Savage as Dr. Stacy (season 3; voice only seasons 1 and 4), a therapist and radio talk show host
 Paul Rodriguez as Javier Mendez (season 3), Gary's father
 Azie Tesfai as Cassandra (season 4)
 Mario Van Peebles as Ronald (season 4), Regina's father

Episodes

Series overview

Season 1 (2018–19)

Season 2 (2019–20)

Season 3 (2020–21)

Season 4 (2021–22)

Season 5 (2023)

Production

Development

On August 18, 2017, ABC landed a series titled A Million Little Things with a put pilot commitment, to be written by DJ Nash, who would serve as executive producer alongside Aaron Kaplan and Dana Honor. The series was described as "being in the tone of The Big Chill," with the title stemming from the popular adage, "Friendship isn't a big thing – it's a million little things." Nash came up with the idea for the series following his single-camera comedy pilot Losing It. He said that "Sometimes in comedy, you have to apologize for adding drama, which is why I was so thrilled to see ABC's passion for a drama that has comedy". ABC officially ordered the series to pilot in January 2018, and the show was officially picked up to series on May 9, 2018. The series is produced by ABC Studios and Kapital Entertainment. In October 2018, the show was picked for a full season of 17 episodes. On February 5, 2019, during the TCA press tour, A Million Little Things was renewed for a second season. On August 8, 2019, it was announced that ABC had ordered a full season for the second season. On May 21, 2020, ABC renewed the series for a third season. At the PaleyFest New York panel, Nash announced that the COVID-19 pandemic and the Black Lives Matter movement will be part of the storylines for the third season. On May 14, 2021, ABC renewed the series for a fourth season which will consists of 20 episodes. On May 13, 2022, ABC renewed the series for a fifth season. On November 7, 2022, ABC announced that the fifth season would be its last.

Casting
On February 6, 2018, David Giuntoli was cast as Eddie. A week later, Romany Malco was cast as Rome. By the end of the month, Christina Ochoa had joined the cast as Ashley, along with Anne Son as Katherine, Christina Moses as Regina Howard, and James Roday Rodriguez as Gary. In early March 2018, Stéphanie Szostak was cast as Delilah, while Lizzy Greene was cast as Sophie Dixon. That month, it was also revealed that Ron Livingston had joined the series in an unspecified role, which was revealed with the series order in May to be the character Jon. On June 27, 2018, Grace Park was cast as Katherine, replacing Anne Son who was in the original pilot.

Filming
Production on the pilot took place from March 12 to 29, 2018, in Vancouver, British Columbia. Principal photography for the first season began on July 24, 2018, and concluded on February 4, 2019. Filming for the second season began on June 19, 2019, and ended on February 19, 2020. Filming for the third season began on August 27, 2020, and ended on May 12, 2021. Production on the fourth season began on July 27, 2021, and concluded on April 13, 2022. Filming for the fifth season began on September 7, 2022, and concluded on March 3, 2023.

Music
The soundtrack for the first season was released digitally on March 1, 2019, by Hollywood Records.

Release

Broadcast
The series premiered on September 26, 2018 on ABC.  The second season premiered on September 26, 2019. The third season premiered on November 19, 2020. The fourth season premiered on September 22, 2021. The fifth and final season premiered on February 8, 2023. In Canada, the series aired on Citytv for the first three seasons before moving to the W Network. In Turkey, the series broadcast through pay broadcaster Digiturk. In Germany, it streams on Disney+. In Australia, it streams on Stan and Paramount+.

Home media
The first season was released on DVD in Region 1 on August 27, 2019.

Reception

Critical response
On review aggregation Rotten Tomatoes, the series holds an approval rating of 53% with an average rating of 6.34/10, based on 32 reviews. The website's critical consensus reads, "Despite a decent ensemble and a few intriguing elements, A MillIon Little Things breaks under the weight of its own emotionally lofty ambitions." Metacritic, which uses a weighted average, assigned the series a score of 51 out of 100 based on 18 critics, indicating "mixed or average reviews".

Ratings

Overall

Season 1

Season 2

Season 3

Season 4

Season 5

Awards and nominations

Notes

References

External links
 

2010s American drama television series
2020s American drama television series
2018 American television series debuts
Adultery in television
American Broadcasting Company original programming
English-language television shows
Serial drama television series
Suicide in television
Television series about families
Television series by ABC Studios
Television shows filmed in Vancouver
Television shows about the COVID-19 pandemic
Television shows set in Boston
Television series by Kapital Entertainment
Television Academy Honors winners